Sir Charles Hallé (born Karl Halle; 11 April 181925 October 1895) was an Anglo-German pianist and conductor, and founder of The Hallé orchestra in 1858.

Life

Hallé was born Karl Halle on 11 April 1819 in Hagen, Westphalia. After settling in England, he changed his name to Charles Hallé. His first lessons were from his father, an organist. As a child he showed remarkable gifts for pianoforte playing. He performed a sonatina in public at the age of four, and played percussion in the orchestra in his early years. In August 1828 he took part in a concert at Cassel, where he attracted the notice of Spohr.

He then studied under Christian Heinrich Rinck at Darmstadt, Germany in 1835, and as early as 1836 went to Paris, where for twelve years he often associated with Luigi Cherubini, Frédéric Chopin, Franz Liszt and other musicians, and enjoyed the friendship of such great literary figures as Alfred de Musset and George Sand. He had started a set of chamber concerts with Jean-Delphin Alard and Auguste Franchomme with great success.

He had completed one series of them when the revolution of 1848 drove him from Paris, and he settled, with his first wife and two children, in London.

He conducted elsewhere in the country also, as well as performing as a pianist. He was the first pianist to play the complete series of Beethoven's piano sonatas in England. Hallé's piano recitals, given at first from 1850 in his own house, and from 1861 in St James's Hall, Piccadilly, were an important feature of London musical life, and it was due in great measure to them that a knowledge of Beethoven's pianoforte sonatas became general in English society.

Hallé was also the inventor of a mechanical page-turner for pianists.  The pages were preset in the device, and the player would turn each page by means of a foot-mechanism.  "People would go to his concerts just to see the spectacle of leaf after leaf turning over, ghostlike, without the intervention of human hands."

At the Musical Union founded by John Ella, and at the Popular Concerts from their beginning, Hallé was a frequent performer.

He moved to Manchester in 1853 to direct Manchester's Gentleman's Concerts, which had its own orchestra and in May 1857 was asked to put together a small orchestra to play for Prince Albert at the opening ceremony of the Art Treasures of Great Britain, the biggest single exhibition Manchester had ever hosted. 
Hallé accepted the challenge and was so happy with the results that he kept the group together until October, forming the fledgling Hallé Orchestra.

He then started a series of concerts of his own, raising the orchestra to a pitch of perfection quite unknown in England at that time. Hallé decided to continue working with the orchestra as a formal organisation, and it gave its first concert under those auspices on 30 January 1858.

The orchestra's first home was the Free Trade Hall. By 1861 the orchestra was in financial trouble (it performed only two concerts that year), but has survived under a series of accomplished conductors.

In 1888, Hallé was married for a second time to the violinist Wilma Neruda, widow of Ludvig Norman and daughter of Josef Neruda, members of whose family had long been famous for musical talent.

The same year, he was knighted; and in 1890 and 1891 he toured with his wife in Australia and elsewhere. In 1891, he also helped to found the Royal Manchester College of Music, serving as head and chief professor of pianoforte.

He died at Manchester on 25 October 1895, and was buried in Weaste Cemetery, Salford. Lady Hallé, who from 1864 was one of the leading solo violinists of the time, was constantly associated with her husband on the concert stage until his death.

Family
He was twice married: first, on 11 November 1841, to Desirée Smith de Rilieu, who died in 1866; and, secondly, on 26 July 1888, to Madame Wilma Neruda, the distinguished violinist. Charles Edward Hallé, his son by his first wife, became a painter and gallery manager whilst his daughter, Elinor Hallé CBE, was a sculptor and inventor.

Bibliography 
 Michael Kennedy (ed.): The autobiography of Charles Halle: with correspondence and diaries. London 1972.
 Charles Halle - The musical and social life of a Victorian superstar.  By his grandson Charles Martin Halle. Manchester 2010

Notes

References

Charles Rigby: Sir Charles Halle, A Portrait for Today. Foreword by Sir John Barbirolli. Publisher: The Dolphin Press, Manchester. 1st edn.  1952

External links 

 Sir Charles Hallé in Oxford DNB

1819 births
1895 deaths
English people of German descent
People from the Province of Westphalia
German classical pianists
Male classical pianists
German conductors (music)
German male conductors (music)
Knights Bachelor
Conductors (music) awarded knighthoods
Musicians awarded knighthoods
19th-century conductors (music)
19th-century classical pianists
19th-century German male musicians